In the Dominican Republic, güevedoces (from , from Dominican Spanish  "testicles at twelve") are children with a specific type of intersexuality. Güevedoces are classified as girls when they are born but, around the age of 12, they start developing male genitalia. This is due to a deficiency in the production of 5α-reductase, an enzyme involved in the metabolism of testosterone to dihydrotestosterone. The same phenomenon occurs in Papua New Guinea, where it is called kwolu-aatmwol (literally 'a female thing changing into a male thing') by the Sambia people, and in Turkey. Anne Fausto-Sterling states that güevedoces (as well as people in Papua New Guinea with 5α-reductase deficiency) "are recognised as a third sex" by their cultures, while the cultures "nevertheless recognize only two gender roles".

Early research 
The first scientific investigations of güevedoces occurred in the 1970s, when Julianne Imperato-McGinley, an endocrinologist from Cornell University, traveled to the village of Las Salinas in the Dominican Republic to investigate reports of apparently female children becoming male children at the onset of puberty. The cause was determined to be 5α-Reductase deficiency, and the results were published in the journal Science in 1974. The frequency of the deficiency was found to be unusually high in Las Salinas, with occurrence ratio of 1 güevedoce to every 90 unaffected males.

The transformation of a phenotypically female child into a phenotypically male adult at puberty, which is reported to be celebrated in Dominican culture, is the result of a genotypic male (with XY chromosomes) born with a deficiency in the enzyme 5α-reductase. 5α-Reductase is responsible for the reduction of testosterone to dihydrotestosterone. Dihydrotestosterone (DHT) is the hormone responsible for the majority of embryonic development of primary male sexual characteristics such as genital size. However, the oxidized form of the hormone, testosterone, promotes secondary sex characteristics. Thus, an XY child without functioning 5α-reductase cannot convert testosterone into the form that develops primary sex characteristics and will have the appearance of female genitalia. At puberty, when large amounts of testosterone are produced, secondary sex characteristics (e.g., deepening voice, hair pattern changes, muscle anabolism, etc.) develop, thus producing a phenotypic male.

Status in society 
In countries like the United States,  intersex children are often operated on immediately after birth to make their genitals appear either typically male or female. In the Dominican Republic guevedoces are regarded as a third gender, experiencing ambivalent gender socialisation. In adulthood, guevedoces most commonly self-identify as men, but are not necessarily completely treated as such by society.

See also 
 Gender system
 5α-Reductase deficiency

References

External links 

Intersex in society
Gender systems